John William Bettany (born 16 December 1937- 24 October 2019)  was an English former professional footballer who played in the Football League as a wing half for Huddersfield Town, Barnsley and Rotherham United in the 1960s and 1970s.

References

External links
 

1937 births
Living people
People from Maltby, South Yorkshire
English footballers
Association football midfielders
Huddersfield Town A.F.C. players
Barnsley F.C. players
Rotherham United F.C. players
Goole Town F.C. players
English Football League players
Footballers from Yorkshire